In number theory, a branch of mathematics, a cusp form is a particular kind of modular form with a zero constant coefficient in the Fourier series expansion.

Introduction
A cusp form is distinguished in the case of modular forms for the modular group by the vanishing of the constant coefficient a0 in the Fourier series expansion (see q-expansion)

This Fourier expansion exists as a consequence of the presence in the modular group's action on the upper half-plane via the transformation

For other groups, there may be some translation through several units, in which case the Fourier expansion is in terms of a different parameter.  In all cases, though, the limit as q → 0 is the limit in the upper half-plane as the imaginary part of z → ∞. Taking the quotient by the modular group, this limit corresponds to a cusp of a modular curve (in the sense of a point added for compactification). So, the definition amounts to saying that a cusp form is a modular form that vanishes at a cusp. In the case of other groups, there may be several cusps, and the definition becomes a modular form vanishing at all cusps. This may involve several expansions.

Dimension
The dimensions of spaces of cusp forms are, in principle, computable via the Riemann–Roch theorem.  For example, the Ramanujan tau function τ(n) arises as the sequence of Fourier coefficients of the cusp form of weight 12 for the modular group, with a1 = 1. The space of such forms has dimension 1, which means this definition is possible; and that accounts for the action of Hecke operators on the space being by scalar multiplication (Mordell's proof of Ramanujan's identities). Explicitly it is the modular discriminant

which represents (up to a normalizing constant) the discriminant of the cubic on the right side of the Weierstrass equation of an elliptic curve; and the 24-th power of the Dedekind eta function. The Fourier coefficients here are written

and called 'Ramanujan's tau function', with the normalization τ(1) = 1.

Related concepts
In the larger picture of automorphic forms, the cusp forms are complementary to Eisenstein series, in a discrete spectrum/continuous spectrum, or discrete series representation/induced representation distinction typical in different parts of spectral theory. That is, Eisenstein series can be 'designed' to take on given values at cusps. There is a large general theory, depending though on the quite intricate theory of parabolic subgroups, and corresponding cuspidal representations.

References
Serre, Jean-Pierre, A Course in Arithmetic, Graduate Texts in Mathematics, No. 7, Springer-Verlag, 1978. 
Shimura, Goro, An Introduction to the Arithmetic Theory of Automorphic Functions, Princeton University Press, 1994. 
Gelbart, Stephen, Automorphic Forms on Adele Groups, Annals of Mathematics Studies, No. 83, Princeton University Press, 1975. 

Modular forms